Brownstem spleenwort may refer to two species of spleenwort:

, native to Mexico, Central and South America, and the West Indies
Asplenium platyneuron, native to North America and South Africa